CEPS may refer to:

 Centre for European Policy Studies, a think tank based in Belgium
 Central Europe Pipeline System, a NATO system delivering fuel around Europe
 Customs Excise and Preventive Service, a Government of Ghana agency

See also 
 Cep (disambiguation)